The M-50–Sandstone Creek Bridge, also known as th Tompkins Bridge, is a road bridge carrying M-50 over Sandstone Creek in Tompkins Township, Michigan. It was listed on the National Register of Historic Places in 2000.

History
In the early 1900s, what was then Clinton Road followed the route of what is now M-50. In the 1920s, this bridge was deemed inadequate, and in 1927 the Michigan State Highway Department contracted with Walter Toebe and Company of Shingleton, Michigan, to construct a replacement bridge. The Wisconsin Bridge and Iron Company of Milwaukee was hired to deliver the structural steel. Modern metal guardrails were later added along the inner faces of the railings, but the bridge still carries traffic along M-50.

Description
The M-50–Sandstone Creek Bridge is a steel deck, plate girder bridge with a  span. It has a  concrete deck with a two-lane,  roadway. The deck is supported by nine concrete-encased plate girders. The bridge has concrete parapet railings, ornamented with recessed panels along the inner and outer faces. Modern metal guardrails are bolted along the inner railing faces. It has a substructure of concrete abutments and wingwalls.

See also

References

External links
Photos of the Tompkins Bridge from HistoricBridges.org

National Register of Historic Places in Jackson County, Michigan
Bridges completed in 1927
Bridges on the National Register of Historic Places in Michigan